Jefferson Forest High School (JFHS) is one of the three high schools in Bedford County, Virginia. Jefferson Forest High School was first opened in 1972. The school's Principal is Brian Wilson, and the assistant principals are Jennifer Kline, Ben Martin, and Twanna Hancock.

History
JFHS is designed with four levels and houses over sixty-six classrooms. In 2008-2009, the school was renovated and added two new science and math hallways. In addition to regular classrooms, there is a library, weight room, gymnasium, auditorium, home economics room, industrial arts facility, band room, chorus room, and an art room. Jefferson Forest High School's past enrollment in 2006–2008 is 1,250 students and 1,375 in 2008–2009. There are 180 days in the school year. Each day starts with an optional zero period at 7:55 am and continues with six additional periods.

In 2018 and 2019, several controversial incidents occurred, including two where students displayed a Confederate flag and shared photos during the school's Spirit Week. This led to discussion at the school board level, including a proposal to ban the display of "any symbols of racism or oppression".

Staff
Support staff includes four administrators, four guidance counselors, two librarians, and one full-time and one part-time school nurse, and five secretaries. In addition, there is one English as a Second Language (ESL) teacher. 39% of teachers hold advanced degrees. 61% hold four-year degrees including seven teachers holding provisional licenses. All administrators hold advanced degrees. Five aides serve as personnel resources for the library, special education classrooms, and guidance office. One full-time resource officer provided by the county sheriff’s department assists with legal and safety issues. The custodial staff includes nine employees, and the cafeteria staff includes nine part-time and two full-time employees.

Athletics
Soccer- State Champs 2011 (Boys),2017 (Girls), Runners-up in 2004 and 2021, State Semifinalists in 1999, 2000, 2006, 2009, 2012
Football - State Runners-up 1979 & 1991; State Champs Division 3 1992 and 1993
Girls Volleyball - State Champs 1997,State Runners-Up in 1984,1996 and 2003
Outdoor Track – State Champs 1999, 2000, and 2001, triple crown champs.
Baseball - State Champs 1988; State runners-up 1989; state runner up 2015
Band - 9th place at Nationals and a Virginia State Honor Band, National Concert Festival in Indianopolis, Indiana, 2012, 2018, Gold Medal at Carnegie Hall, 2017, State Champions Group 4A, 2018 
Swimming- State 3rd place 2009, Boys 4A State Champions 2016-17 season 
Theatre - State Runners-up 2012, 2014, 2016, 2022 Class 4 State Champions 2019, 2020 and 2021
Film - State Champs (Commercial/PSA) 2018, (Animation) 2022, Audience Choice (Experimental) 2019, 2022, (Animation) 2022
Improv - VTA State Champs 2015, 2016, 2019
Competition Cheerleading- State Champs 2003
Cross country - Seminole District Champions 1994-2014, Girl’s State Champions 2000,2001,2013,2014, Boys' State Champions 2020
Diving - State Champion 2019
Scholastic Bowl - Class 4 State 2nd place (2021)

Notable alumni
Jake Grove (1980-), All-American Offensive Lineman at Virginia Tech and former Center for the Oakland Raiders and Miami Dolphins
Anthony Poindexter (1976-), All American and NCAA Hall of Fame Safety at University of Virginia. Former Special Teams member for the Baltimore Ravens, coach at Purdue University.

References

External links
Jefferson Forest High School

Public high schools in Virginia
Schools in Bedford County, Virginia
1972 establishments in Virginia